Sportin' Life is a 2020 documentary film directed by Abel Ferrara. An Italian-French-British co-production, the film features Ferrara, Willem Dafoe, Cristina Chiriac, Anna Ferrara, Paul Hipp and Joe Delia.

It had its world premiere at the Venice Film Festival on 4 September, 2020.

Production
In June 2020, it was announced Ferrara had directed a documentary film titled Sportin' Life.

Release
The film had its world premiere at the Venice Film Festival on 4 September, 2020.

References

External links
 

2020 documentary films
2020 films
British documentary films
Documentary films about the COVID-19 pandemic
Films directed by Abel Ferrara
Films scored by Joe Delia
French documentary films
Italian documentary films
2020s English-language films
2020s British films
2020s French films
2020s Italian films